Second Identity is a hardstyle music project consisting of Dennis Koehoorn (Scope DJ) and Onne Witjes (A-Lusion). The two created the project in 2010, releasing their first release under Scantraxx Silver, and an album under Scantraxx later that year. Second Identity has played at numerous festivals, including Reverze Festival in Belgium.

References

Dutch musical groups